John Nesbitt (August 23, 1910 – August 10, 1960) was an actor, narrator, announcer, producer and screenwriter. Nesbitt was best known as the narrator of the MGM series Passing Parade.

Early years
Nesbitt, born John Booth Nesbitt in Victoria, British Columbia, was a grandson of actor Edwin Booth. He attended Saint Mary's College of California and the University of California.

Stage
Nesbitt was active in stock theater in Vancouver and Spokane.

Radio
Nesbitt began working for NBC in San Francisco in 1933. In 1935, he was an announcer at KFRC in San Francisco.

His signature program, The Passing Parade, was first broadcast in 1937 and ended in 1949, sometimes in 15-minute episodes and sometimes in 30-minute episodes. At one time or another, it was carried on the CBS, Mutual, NBC Blue and NBC Red networks. The Passing Parade was also a segment on The John Charles Thomas Show (1943-1946). and on the summer replacement program, The Meredith Willson-John Nesbitt Show (1942).

In the evening of June 6, 1944, known as D-Day in the Allied countries, Nesbitt broadcast a Passing Parade segment on CBS which captured the historical significance of the military invasion by imagining its story being retold 100 years in the future  to schoolchildren. 

Joseph M. Koehler described Nesbitt's talent in a review in the July 31, 1943, issue of Billboard: "His sense of the dramatic, uncanny timing and ability to discover the exact moment when drama must replace the spoken word combine to explain why he's radio's No. 1 story-teller."

Nesbitt was also host of the anthology program So the Story Goes, which was syndicated in 1945–1946.

Recognition
Nesbitt has two stars on the Hollywood Walk of Fame, one at 1717 Vine Street in the Motion Pictures section and one at 6200 Hollywood Boulevard in the Radio section. Both were dedicated February 8, 1960.

Personal life
In 1940, Nesbitt bought the Ennis House and had it altered by Frank Lloyd Wright, adding a north-terrace pool and ground-floor billiard room, as well as the first heating system for the building.

Death
Nesbitt died on August 10, 1960, in Carmel, California.

Partial filmography
 That Mothers Might Live (1938) Producer & Narrator
 Main Street on the March! (1941) Producer & Narrator
 Of Pups and Puzzles (1941) Producer & Narrator
 Stairway to Light (1945) Writer & Narrator
 Goodbye, Miss Turlock (1948) Producer, Writer & Narrator
 Telephone Time (1956–1957) Host, Writer & Narrator

References

External links

1910 births
1960 deaths
Film producers from British Columbia
Canadian male film actors
Canadian male screenwriters
Male actors from Victoria, British Columbia
Writers from Victoria, British Columbia
20th-century Canadian male actors
20th-century Canadian screenwriters